Wadi al-Dawasir Domestic Airport is an airport serving Wadi al-Dawasir (also spelled Wadi ad-Dawasir), a town in Riyadh Province, Saudi Arabia. The airport was established in 1990.

Facilities

Airlines and destinations

Airlines offering scheduled passenger service:

References

External links
 
 
 

Airports in Saudi Arabia
Riyadh Province
1990 establishments in Saudi Arabia
Airports established in 1990